Karl-Rudolf Silberg-Sillak (20 March 1906 – 17 December 1974) was an Estonian footballer, who made 52 appearances for the Estonia national team between 1929 and 1938. He also made 12 appearances for the Estonia national bandy team and Estonia national ice hockey team.

Sillak was born in Märjamaa in 1906, and began playing for Sport in 1923. He earned his first cap for the Estonian national team in 1929, and became a mainstay in the defensive line in the 1930s.

Early life
Sillak was born in Märjamaa. He began playing football in 1919, at age 13, with the Sport U19 academy.

Club career
Sillak began playing with Sport's senior team in 1923. That year, Sport, who had won the previous two Meistriliiga, lost to Kalev Tallinn. After the loss that year, Sillak and Eugen Einman constituted a strong defensive line which resulted in Sport winning the Meistriliiga in 1924, 1925, and 1927. Although Einman was transferred to Tallinna Jalgpalliklubi in 1927, Sillak also won the Meistriliiga in 1929, 1931, and 1932.

After winning the Meistriliiga in 1932, Sillak was transferred to Tallinna Jalgpalliklubi. He played for the club until 1940, the final official year of the Meistriliiga until 1945, when Estonia became part of the Soviet Union, and the Meistriliiga became the Estonian SSR Football Championship.

Sillak played briefly for Spartaki in the Georgian SSR Football Championship, playing sparingly until his retirement in 1951.

International career
Sillak made his first international appearance for Estonia on 16 August 1929 against Latvia. He was a defensive mainstay for Estonia in the 1930s, appearing 49 times.

Sillak won the 1929 Baltic Cup with Estonia.

Sillak scored his only goal for Estonia on 3 June 1937.

International goals
Scores and results list Estonia's goal tally first.

After football
Sillak retired from football in 1951. He died at age 68 on 17 December 1974, in Tallinn.

Honours
Meistriliiga: (6)
1924, 1925, 1927, 1929, 1931, 1932

Estonian Cup: (1)
1939

Baltic Cup: (1)
1929

References

1906 births
1974 deaths
People from Märjamaa
Estonian footballers
Estonia international footballers
FC Spartaki Tskhinvali players
Association football defenders